Rattan, also spelled ratan, is the name for roughly 600 species of Old World climbing palms belonging to subfamily Calamoideae. The greatest diversity of rattan palm species and genera are in the closed-canopy old-growth tropical forests of Southeast Asia, though they can also be found in other parts of tropical Asia and Africa. Most rattan palms are ecologically considered lianas due to their climbing habits, unlike other palm species. A few species also have tree-like or shrub-like habits.

Around 20% of rattan palm species are economically important and are traditionally used in Southeast Asia in producing wickerwork furniture, baskets, canes, woven mats, cordage, and other handicrafts. Rattan canes are one of the world's most valuable non-timber forest products. Some species of rattan also have edible scaly fruit and heart of palm. Despite increasing attempts in the last 30 years at commercial cultivation, almost all rattan products still come from wild-harvested plants. Rattan supplies are now rapidly threatened due to deforestation and overexploitation. Rattan were also historically known as Malacca cane or Manila cane, based on their trade origins, as well as numerous other trade names for individual species.

Description 

Most rattan palms are classified ecologically as lianas, because most mature rattan palms have a vine-like habit, scrambling through and over other vegetation. But they differ from true woody lianas in several ways. Because rattans are palms, they do not branch and they rarely develop new root structures upon contact of the stem with soil. They are also monocots and thus do not exhibit secondary growth. This means, the diameter of the rattan stem is always constant. This also means juvenile rattan palms are rigid enough to remain free-standing, unlike true lianas which always need structural support, even when young. Many rattans also have spines which act as hooks to aid climbing over other plants, and to deter herbivores. The spines also give rattans the ability to climb wide-diameter trees, unlike other vines which use tendrils or twining which can only climb narrower supports. Rattans have been known to grow up to hundreds of metres long. 

A few species of rattans are non-climbing. These range from free-standing tree-like species (like Retispatha dumetosa) to acaulescent shrub-like species with short subterranean stems (like Calamus pygmaeus).

Rattans can also be solitary (single-stemmed), clustering (clump-forming), or both. Solitary rattan species grow into a single stem. Clustering rattan, on the other hand, develop clumps of up to 50 stems via suckers, similar to bamboo and bananas. These clusters can produce new stems continually as individual stems die. The impact of harvesting is much greater in solitary species, since the whole plant dies when harvested. An example of a commercially important single-stemmed species is Calamus manan.  Clustering species, on the other hand, have more potential to become sustainable if the rate of harvesting does not exceed the rate of stem replacement via vegetative reproduction.

Rattans also display two types of flowering: hapaxanthy and pleonanthy. All the species of the genera Korthalsia, Laccosperma, Plectocomia, Plectocomiopsis, and Myrialepis are hapaxanthic; as well as a few species of Daemonorops. This means they only flower and fruit once then die. All other rattan species are pleonanthic, being able to flower and fruit continually. Most commercially harvested species are pleonanthic, because hapaxanthic rattans tend to have soft piths making them unsuitable for bending.

Taxonomy 

Calamoideae also includes tree palms such as Raphia (Raffia) and Metroxylon (Sago palm) and shrub palms such as Salacca (Salak) (Uhl & Dransfield 1987 Genera Palmarum). The climbing habit in palms is not restricted to Calamoideae, but has also evolved in three other evolutionary lines—tribes Cocoseae (Desmoncus with c. 7–10 species in the New World tropics) and Areceae (Dypsis scandens in Madagascar) in subfamily Arecoideae, and tribe Hyophorbeae (climbing species of the large genus Chamaedorea in Central America) in subfamily Ceroxyloideae. They do not have spinose stems and climb by means of their reflexed terminal leaflets. Of these only Desmoncus spp. furnish stems of sufficiently good quality to be used as rattan cane substitutes.

There are 13 different genera of rattans that include around 600 species. Some of the species in these "rattan genera" have a different habit and do not climb, they are shrubby palms of the forest undergrowth; nevertheless they are close relatives to species that are climbers and they are hence included in the same genera. The largest rattan genus is Calamus, distributed in Asia except for one species represented in Africa. From the remaining rattan genera, Ceratolobus, Korthalsia, Plectocomia, Plectocomiopsis, Myrialepis, Calospatha, Pogonotium and Retispatha, are centered in Southeast Asia with outliers eastwards and northwards; and three are endemic to Africa: Laccosperma (syn. Ancistrophyllum), Eremospatha and Oncocalamus.

The rattan genera and their distribution (Uhl & Dransfield 1987 Genera Palmarum, Dransfield 1992):

In Uhl & Dransfield (1987 Genera Palmarum, 2ºed. 2008), and also Dransfield & Manokaran (1993), a great deal of basic introductory information is available.

Available rattan floras and monographs by region (2002):

Uses by taxon.

The major commercial species of rattan canes as identified for Asia by Dransfield and Manokaran (1993) and for Africa, by Tuley (1995) and Sunderland (1999) (Desmoncus not treated here):

Utilized Calamus species canes:

Other traditional uses of rattans by species:

Etymology 
The name "rattan" is first attested in English in the 1650s. It is derived from the Malay name rotan. Probably ultimately from rautan  (from raut, "to trim" or "to pare").

Ecology 
Many rattan species also form mutualistic relationships with ant species. They provide ant shelters (myrmecodomatia) like hollow spines, funnel-shaped leaves, or leaf sheath extensions (ochreae). The rattans in turn, gain protection from herbivores.

Conservation 
Rattans are threatened with overexploitation, as harvesters are cutting stems too young and reducing their ability to resprout. Unsustainable harvesting of rattan can lead to forest degradation, affecting overall forest ecosystem services. Processing can also be polluting. The use of toxic chemicals and petrol in the processing of rattan affects soil, air and water resources, and also ultimately people's health. Meanwhile, the conventional method of rattan production is threatening the plant's long-term supply, and the income of workers.

Rattans also exhibit rapid population growths in disturbed forest edges due to higher light availability than in the closed-canopy old-growth tropical forests. Although this can mean increased rattan abundance for economic exploitation, it can also be problematic in long-term conservation efforts.

Rattan harvesting from the wild in most rattan-producing countries requires permits. These include the Philippines, Sri Lanka, India, Malaysia, Laos, Ghana, and Cameroon. In addition, the Philippines also imposes an annual allowable cut in an effort to conserve rattan resources. Rattan cultivation (both monoculture and intercropping) is also being researched and pioneered in some countries, though it is still a young industry and only constitutes a minority of the rattan resources harvested annually.

Uses 

In forests where rattan grows, its economic value can help protect forest land, by providing an alternative to loggers who forgo timber logging and harvest rattan canes instead. Rattan is much easier to harvest, requires simpler tools and is much easier to transport. It also grows much faster than most tropical wood. This makes it a potential tool in forest maintenance, since it provides a profitable crop that depends on rather than replaces trees. It remains to be seen whether rattan can be as profitable or useful as the alternatives.

Cleaned rattan stems with the leaf sheaths removed are superficially similar to bamboo. Unlike bamboo, rattan stems are not hollow. Most (70%) of the world's rattan population exist in Indonesia, distributed among the islands Borneo, Sulawesi, and Sumbawa. The rest of the world's supply comes from the  Philippines, Sri Lanka, Malaysia, Bangladesh and Assam, India.

Food source 
Some rattan fruits are edible, with a sour taste akin to citrus. The fruit of some rattans exudes a red resin called dragon's blood; this resin was thought to have medicinal properties in antiquity and was used as a dye for violins, among other things. The resin normally results in a wood with a light peach hue. In the Indian state of Assam, the shoot is also used as vegetable.

The stem tips are rich in starch, and can be eaten raw or roasted. Long stems can be cut to obtain potable water. The palm heart can also be eaten raw or cooked.

Medicinal potential 
In early 2010, scientists in Italy announced that rattan wood would be used in a new "wood to bone" process for the production of artificial bone. The process takes small pieces of rattan and places it in a furnace. Calcium and carbon are added. The wood is then further heated under intense pressure in another oven-like machine, and a phosphate solution is introduced. This process produces almost an exact replica of bone material. The process takes about 10 days. At the time of the announcement the bone was being tested in sheep, and there had been no signs of rejection. Particles from the sheep's bodies have migrated to the "wood bone" and formed long, continuous bones. The new bone-from-wood programme is being funded by the European Union. Implants into humans were anticipated to start in 2015.

Rattan chair 

Rattans are extensively used for making baskets and furniture. When cut into sections, rattan can be used as wood to make furniture. Rattan accepts paints and stains like many other kinds of wood, so it is available in many colours, and it can be worked into many styles. Moreover, the inner core can be separated and worked into wicker. A typical braiding pattern is called Wiener Geflecht, Viennese Braiding, as it was invented in 18th century Vienna and later most prominently used with the Thonet coffeehouse chair.  

Generally, raw rattan is processed into several products to be used as materials in furniture making. From a strand of rattan, the skin is usually peeled off, to be used as rattan weaving material. The remaining "core" of the rattan can be used for various purposes in furniture making. Rattan is a very good material, mainly because it is lightweight, durable, and, to a certain extent, flexible and suitable for outdoor use.

Clothing
Traditionally, the women of the Wemale ethnic group of Seram Island, Indonesia wore rattan girdles around their waist.

Corporal punishment 

Thin rattan canes were the standard implement for school corporal punishment in England and Wales, and are still used for this purpose in schools in Malaysia, Singapore, and several African countries. The usual maximum number of strokes was six, traditionally referred to as getting "Six of the best". Similar canes are used for military punishments in the Singapore Armed Forces. Heavier canes, also of rattan, are used for judicial corporal punishments in Aceh, Brunei, Malaysia, and Singapore.

Wicks 
Rattan is the preferred natural material used to wick essential oils in aroma reed diffusers (commonly used in aromatherapy, or merely to scent closets, passageways, and rooms), because each rattan reed contains 20 or more permeable channels that wick the oil from the container up the stem and release fragrance into the air, through an evaporation diffusion process. In contrast, reeds made from bamboo contain nodes that inhibit the passage of essential oils.

Handicraft and arts 
Many of the properties of rattan that make it suitable for furniture also make it a popular choice for handicraft and art pieces. Uses include rattan baskets, plant containers, and other decorative works.

Due to its durability and resistance to splintering, sections of rattan can be used as canes, crooks for high-end umbrellas, or staves for martial arts.

Along with birch and bamboo, rattan is a common material used for the handles in percussion mallets, especially mallets for keyboard percussion, e.g., marimba, vibraphone, xylophone, etc.

Shelter material 
Most natives or locals from the rattan rich countries employ the aid of this sturdy plant in their home building projects. It is heavily used as a housing material in rural areas. The skin of the plant or wood is primarily used for weaving.

Sports equipment
Rattan cane is also used traditionally to make polo mallets, though only a small portion of cane harvested (roughly 3%) is strong, flexible, and durable enough to be made into sticks for polo mallets, and popularity of rattan mallets is waning next the more modern variant, fibrecanes.

Weaponry

Fire-hardened rattan were commonly used as the shafts of Philippine spears collectively known as sibat. They were fitted with a variety of iron spearheads and ranged from short throwing versions to heavy thrusting weapons. They were used for hunting, fishing, or warfare (both land and naval warfare). The rattan shafts of war spears are usually elaborately ornamented with carvings and metal inlays. Arnis also makes prominent use of rattan as "arnis sticks", commonly called yantok or baston. Their durability and weight makes it ideal for training with complex execution of techniques as well as being a choice of weapon, even against bladed objects.

 Rattan sheilds were historically used in ancient, mediaeval and early modern China and Korea. According to some contemporary sources, they were reasonably effective against both arrows and early firearms. 

It sees also prominent use in battle re-enactments as stand-ins to potentially lethal weapons.

Rattan can also be used to build a functional sword that delivers a non-lethal but similar impact compared to steel counterparts.

See also
Amakan
Sennit

References

Further reading 
 Siebert, Stephen F. (2012). The Nature and Culture of Rattan: Reflections on Vanishing Life in the Forests of Southeast Asia. University of Hawai'i Press. .

External links 

 
 

Calamoideae
Fiber plants
Non-timber forest products
Arecaceae
Spanking
Wood
Palm trees in culture